This is a list of railway lines on the Finnish rail network, including lists of stations on the most important lines. The lines and the stations are owned by the Finnish Transport Agency. VR Group has a monopoly on passenger transport. As of 2011, it is the only operator of freight trains as well even though freight transport is open for private companies.

Passenger lines

Line 1: Helsinki–Turku (Rantarata/Kustbanan)

Line 4: Helsinki–Pori

 Helsinki Central
 Pasila
 Tikkurila
 Riihimäki
 Hämeenlinna
 Toijala
 Tampere
 Nokia
 Vammala
 Kokemäki
 Harjavalta
 Pori

Line 5: Helsinki–Vaasa

 Helsinki Central
 Pasila
 Tikkurila
 Riihimäki
 Hämeenlinna
 Toijala
 Tampere
 Parkano
 Seinäjoki
 Ylistaro
 Isokyrö
 Tervajoki
 Laihia
 Vaasa

Line 7: Helsinki–Kemijärvi

 Helsinki Central
 Pasila
 Tikkurila
 Riihimäki
 Hämeenlinna
 Toijala
 Tampere
 Parkano
 Seinäjoki
 Lapua
 Kauhava
 Jakobstad-Pedersöre (formerly Bennäs)
 Kokkola
 Kannus
 Ylivieska
 Oulainen
 Vihanti
 Ruukki
 Oulu
 Kemi
 Tervola
 Muurola
 Rovaniemi
 Kemijärvi

Line 9: Turku–Pieksämäki

 Turku Harbour
 Turku Central
 Loimaa
 Humppila
 Toijala
 Tampere
 Orivesi
 Jämsä
 Jyväskylä
 Lievestuore
 Hankasalmi
 Pieksämäki

Line 10: Helsinki–Iisalmi

 Helsinki Central
 Pasila
 Tikkurila
 Mäntsälä
 Lahti
 Kouvola
 Mäntyharju
 Mikkeli
 Haukivuori
 Pieksämäki
 Suonenjoki
 Kuopio
 Siilinjärvi
 Lapinlahti
 Iisalmi

Line 13: Helsinki–Kajaani

 Helsinki Central
 Pasila
 Tikkurila
 Lahti
 Kouvola
 Mäntyharju
 Mikkeli
 Pieksämäki
 Suonenjoki
 Kuopio
 Siilinjärvi
 Lapinlahti
 Iisalmi
 Sukeva
 Kajaani

Line 14: Helsinki–Joensuu

 Helsinki Central
 Pasila
 Tikkurila
 Lahti
 Kouvola
 Lappeenranta
 Joutseno
 Imatra
 Simpele
 Parikkala
 Kesälahti
 Kitee
 Joensuu

Line 15: Kouvola–Kotka

 Kouvola
 Myllykoski
 Inkeroinen
 Tavastila
 Kymi
 Kyminlinna
 Paimenportti
 Kotka (central)
 Kotka Harbour

Line 16: Savonlinna–Parikkala

 Savonlinna (old, closed)
 Savonlinna (current)
 Pääskylahti
 Kerimäki
 Retretti
 Lusto
 Punkaharju
 Putikko (closed)
 Kultakivi (closed)
 Särkisalmi (closed)
 Parikkala

International line A: Helsinki–Moscow

 Helsinki Central
 Pasila
 Tikkurila
 Lahti
 Kouvola
 Vainikkala
 Vyborg
 St Petersburg Finland terminal
 St Petersburg Ladozhsky terminal
 Tver
 Moscow Leningradsky terminal

Other lines

 Line 2: Karis–Hanko (Hanko–Hyvinkää railway)
 Line 3: Helsinki–Tampere
 Line 6: Helsinki–Tampere–Seinäjoki–Oulu–Kolari (Tampere-Seinäjoki railway, Seinäjoki–Oulu railway, Oulu–Tornio railway and Kolari railway)
 Line 7: Helsinki–Tampere–Seinäjoki–Oulu–Kemijärvi
 Line 7A: Kemijärvi–Rovaniemi
 Line 9: Turku–Tampere–Jyväskylä–Joensuu
 Line 11: Tampere–Haapamäki–Seinäjoki
 Line 12: Helsinki–Kotka
 Line 13: Helsinki–Kuopio–Oulu
 Line 14A: Joensuu–Nurmes
 Line 14A: Oulu–Kajaani (Oulu–Kontiomäki railway)
 Line 18: Iisalmi–Ylivieska

 See also: Lapponia (train)

Future lines
 Arctic Railway
 Helsinki City Rail Loop
 Helsinki–Turku high-speed railway
 Itärata
 Lentorata

References

Literature

External links 
 Finnish Transport Agency, railways

Finland
 
 
Railway lines